Battery Park is an American sitcom television series starring Elizabeth Perkins and Justin Louis. The series premiered Thursday March 23, 2000 at 9:30 p.m Eastern time on NBC. The show was cancelled after four episodes. The series was about a police department in Battery Park, Manhattan, New York City.

Cast
Elizabeth Perkins as Captain Madeleine Dunleavy
Justin Louis as Lieutenant Ben Hardin
Jacqueline Obradors as Detective Elena Vera
Frank Grillo as Detective Antony "Stig" Stigliano
Bokeem Woodbine as Detective Derek Finley
Robert Mailhouse as Detective Kevin Strain
Jay Paulson as Detective Carl Zernial
Wendy Moniz as Maria DiCenzo
Sam Lloyd as Ray Giddeon

Production
The series was loosely based on Sugar Hill, an ABC pilot which had aired a year earlier.

Episodes
Seven episodes are registered with the United States Copyright Office.

Reception
Henry Winkler had received an Emmy nomination for 'Outstanding Guest Actor in a Comedy' for his appearance in the episode Walter's Rib, but after a newspaper reporter pointed out that the episode had been postponed to June from an earlier scheduled airdate and therefore missed the Emmy's May 31 deadline, the nomination was withdrawn.

References

External links
 

2000s American sitcoms
2000s American police comedy television series
2000 American television series debuts
2000 American television series endings
English-language television shows
Fictional portrayals of the New York City Police Department
NBC original programming
Television shows set in New York City
Television series by DreamWorks Television
Television series by Ubu Productions
Television series created by Gary David Goldberg